This is a list of people from the metropolitan borough of Bury in North West England. It includes people from the town of Bury and also people from the towns of Radcliffe, Prestwich, Whitefield, Tottington, Ramsbottom, and other places which together form the Metropolitan Borough of Bury. This list is arranged alphabetically by surname.

A
 David Abrahams, Director of Isaac Newton Institute for Mathematical Sciences (born 1958)
 W. Geoffrey Arnott (1930–2010), classics scholar
 Gemma Atkinson (born 1984), actress, model and TV personality; born in Bury

B
 Steve Berry, TV and radio presenter; born and educated in Bury
 Micah Barlow, cricketer; born in Bury
 Tony Binns, professor of geography
 Celia Birtwell, textile and fashion designer and muse of David Hockney; raised in Prestwich and attended St. Margaret's Primary School
 Black Jackson, rock band formed in 2000 
 Cherie Blair (born 1954), barrister; former Prime Minister Tony Blair's wife; born in Bury, moved to Liverpool
 Danny Boyle (born 1956), filmmaker and producer; born in Radcliffe
 Alistair Burt (born 1955), Conservative MP for Bury North, 1983–1997; MP for North East Bedfordshire, 2001–
 Gary Burgess (1975-2022), radio presenter and television journalist
 Richard Buxton (1786–1865), botanist; born in Prestwich

C
 Noel Castree, author; professor of geography
 Sir John Charnley (1911–1982), orthopaedic surgeon; hip replacement pioneer; born in Bury
 David Chaytor (born 1949), Labour MP for Bury North 1997–2010; convicted fraudster
Catherine Chisholm (born 1878 Radcliffe) British physician; first female graduate University of Manchester; key founder Manchester Babies Hospital (opened 1914)
 Antony Cotton (born Anthony Dunn) (born 1975), British actor; plays Sean Tully in Coronation Street
 Walter Clegg (18 April 1920–15 April 1994), British Conservative politician
 Lol Creme, of the band 10cc; from Prestwich
 Richmal Crompton (1890–1969), real name Richmal Crompton Lamburn; author of Just William stories
 Cecil Cronshaw (1889–1961), pioneer of modern dyes; Chairman and Director of ICI
 Brian Cubbon (1928–2015), former Permanent Secretary, Home Office and Northern Ireland Office

D
 Victoria Derbyshire (born 1968), journalist and radio presenter; born in Ramsbottom
 Nick Derbyshire (born 1970), Cricketer; born in Ramsbottom, brother of Victoria Derbyshire
 Henry Dunster (1609–1659), first president of Harvard College; native of Bury; fourth headmaster of Bury Grammar School prior to his emigration to Massachusetts in 1640
 Jane Danson [Dawson] (born 1978), actor; born in Radcliffe and attended Radcliffe High School.

E
 Michael Edelson (born 1944), businessman; Director of Manchester United Football Club
 Elbow, band which formed and played its first gig in Bury

F
 Sir William Fawcett (1727–1804), Adjutant-General to the Forces; Governor of the Royal Hospital Chelsea
 Francis Fawkes (1720–1777), poet and translator
 Georgia May Foote, actress and model
 Jenny Frost, singer with the band Atomic Kitten; television presenter; grew up in Prestwich and attended the local Catholic high school, St Monica's
 Liam Frost, musician and songwriter; from Prestwich

G
 Guy Garvey, lead singer of the band Elbow; lives in Prestwich
 Kevin Godley, of the band 10cc; from Prestwich
 Andy Goram, former Scotland goalkeeper
 David Green (born 1948), film director
 Jack Greenall (1905–1983), comic artist - created "Useless Eustace" 
 James Guy (born 1995), swimmer; 200m freestyle gold medallist at the 2015 World Long Course Championships

H
 Nellie Halstead (1910–1991), sprinter who competed in the 1932 Summer Olympics; born in Radcliffe 
 Reg Harris (1920–1992), professional cyclist; twice Olympic silver medallist; born in Birtle
 Alan Haven, jazz organist; born in Prestwich
 Gordon Hewart, 1st Viscount Hewart (1870–1943), lawyer and politician; Lord Chief Justice
 Andrew Higginson (born 1957), Chairman of Morrisons Supermarkets 2015–
 Sir John Holker (1828–1882), Conservative MP for Preston 1872–1882, Attorney-General, 1875–1880
 Henry Holland (born 1983), fashion designer
 Simon Hopkinson, food writer; former chef
 John Horsefield (died 1854), botanist and handloom weaver; born and lived in Besses o' th' Barn

J
 Howard Jacobson (born 1942), writer; born in Prestwich
 John Just (1797–1852), second Master of Bury Grammar School 1832–52; botanist; lectured at the Royal Manchester School of Medicine and Surgery; honorary professor of botany at the Royal Manchester Institution

K
 John Kay (1704–1780), inventor of the flying shuttle; born in Walmersley
 Robert Kay (1728–1802), inventor of the drop box; son of John Kay
 Simon Kelner (born 1957), editor-in-chief of The Independent, 1998–2008
 Myles Kenyon (1886–1960), captain of Lancashire CCC; High Sheriff of Lancashire; born at Walshaw Hall
 Sir Malcolm Knox (1900–1980), philosopher; Vice-Chancellor of the University of St Andrews, 1953–1966

L
 Frank "Foo Foo" Lammar (1937–2003), drag queen and nightclub owner, lived in Shuttleworth
 Allan Levy QC (1943–2004), children's rights lawyer; Chairman of the Pindown Enquiry
Montagu Lomax, assistant medical officer at the Prestwich Asylum, 1917–1919; exposed the inhuman, custodial and antitherapeutic practices there in his book The Experiences of an Asylum Doctor

M
 Geoffrey Moorhouse (1931–2009), author and journalist; writer of Hell's Foundations

N
 Gary Neville (born 1975), footballer; Manchester United defender and captain; brother of Phil Neville
 Phil Neville (born 1977), footballer; Manchester United star & Everton midfielder and captain; brother of Gary Neville and Tracey Neville
 Tracey Neville (born 1977, netballer, England Netball coach; twin sister of Phil Neville
 Roy Newsome (1930–2011), conductor, composer, arranger, and broadcaster
 Amanda Noar (born 1962), actress

P
 Trevor Park (1927–1995), Labour MP for South East Derbyshire, 1964–1970
 Laurence Pearl FRS, Biochemist and Structural Biologist
 Sir Robert Peel (1788–1850), Prime Minister of the United Kingdom; born at Chamber Hall, Bury
 Arlene Phillips, choreographer; born in Prestwich

R
 Mary Reibey, a prominent Australian merchant and shipowner
 Lisa Riley, (born 1976) actress
 Paul Rose (1935–2015), Labour MP for Manchester Blackley, 1964–1979; barrister and writer

S
 Pat Sanderson (born 1977), rugby union player who played for Sale Sharks, Harlequins and Worcester Warriors; won 16 caps for the English national team and was an England captain
 Suzanne Shaw (born 1981), real name Suzanne Crowshaw, member of popgroup Hear'Say; later star of West End shows and television presenter
 Peter Skellern (1947–2017), singer-songwriter; born in Bury
 Dodie Smith (1896–1990), novelist and playwright; writer of 101 Dalmatians; born in Whitefield
 Mark E. Smith, musician and frontman of The Fall; lifelong resident of Prestwich
 John Spencer (1935–2006), snooker player; British champion three times; born in Radcliffe
 Julie Stevens (born 1936), actress; appeared in episodes of TV series The Avengers, Playschool and Playaway; born in Prestwich
 William Sturgeon (1783–1850), physicist and inventor; created the first practical electric motor and electromagnetic solenoid; lived in Prestwich and is buried in St Mary's Cemetery

T
 David Taylor ( born 1980) served in the British Army for 22 years.  Engineer and researcher
 Betty Tebbs (1918–2017), trades unionist, peace campaigner, women's rights campaigner
 Thomas Thompson, writer (1880-1951)
 Dame Janet Thornton FRS, Bioinformatics Researcher (born 1949)
 David Trippier (born 1946), Conservative MP for Rossendale, 1979–1983, MP for Rossendale and Darwen, 1983–1992
 Kieran Trippier, (born 1990), international professional footballer who has played for Burnley and Tottenham before moving to Atletico Madrid in Spain and has played for England at the World Cup and euros, He went to Woodhey High school.

U
 Emma Jane Unsworth, author; grew up in Prestwich and has also lived there as an adult

W
 Ian Wallace (1946–2007), professional musician; drummer with King Crimson, Don Henley, and Bob Dylan; his first group, the Jaguars, was formed in Bury with school friends
 Walter Whitehead, surgeon; President of the British Medical Association in 1902
 James Wood (1760–1839), mathematician; Dean of Ely Cathedral; born in Holcombe
  John Wood, first settler and founder of Woodbury, New Jersey, USA after fleeing religious persecution
 Victoria Wood CBE (1953–2016), comedian, actress, singer and writer; born in Prestwich
 Jeff Wootton (born 1987), guitarist for Gorillaz, Damon Albarn and Liam Gallagher
 Richard Wroe (1641–1718), Warden of the Collegiate Church of St Mary, St Denys and St George in Manchester, 1684–1718
 Paul Whitworth (born 1968), professional darts player on the UK Open
James Worrall (1914–2011), Canadian Olympic Flag-Bearer; former IOC member and president of the Canadian Olympic Committee; Canada's Sports Hall of Fame and Order of Canada recipient.

Y
Adam Yates (born 1992), cyclist; twin brother of Simon Yates
Simon Yates (born 1992), cyclist, winner of 2018 Vuelta a Espana; twin brother of Adam Yates

See also
 List of people from Greater Manchester

References

People from the Metropolitan Borough of Bury
Lists of English people by location
Lists of people from Greater Manchester